Abbeyville is an unincorporated community in Medina County, in the U.S. state of Ohio.

History
The first settlement at Abbeyville was made in 1831. A post office called Abbeyville was established in 1833, and remained in operation until 1902. Abbeyville was named after Abbey, the wife of a first settler.

References

Unincorporated communities in Medina County, Ohio
Unincorporated communities in Ohio
1831 establishments in Ohio